Thomas Fothergill (1791-1858) was an ironmaster at the Pont-hir iron-works and sheriff of Monmouthshire in 1829.

He was the son of Richard Fothergill.

References 

Thomas
1791 births
1858 deaths
British ironmasters
19th-century British businesspeople